Glus may refer to:

Glus, an officer in Cyrus the Younger army and son of Tamos
Glus, a character in the Deltora series